Milton Armory is a historic National Guard armory located at Milton, Northumberland County, Pennsylvania.  It was designed by W.G. Wilkins Co.  It was built in 1922 and expanded in 1930.  It is a "T"-plan building consisting of a two-story administration building with a one-story drill hall executed in the Tudor Revival style.  It is constructed of brick and sits on a concrete foundation.  It features stone window and door surrounds.

It was added to the National Register of Historic Places in 1991.

References

Armories on the National Register of Historic Places in Pennsylvania
Tudor Revival architecture in Pennsylvania
Infrastructure completed in 1930
Buildings and structures in Northumberland County, Pennsylvania
National Register of Historic Places in Northumberland County, Pennsylvania